The Nanzhuang Old Street or Osmanthus Alley is an old street in Nanzhuang Township, Miaoli County, Taiwan.

Name
The street is also called Osmanthus Alley due to the fact that it is famous for its osmanthus wine.

History
The street was the business center of the olden days of the town when it prospered due to the booming of lumber and mining industries within the area. The area however faced a downturn with the declining of those industries.

See also
 List of roads in Taiwan
 List of tourist attractions in Taiwan

References

Streets in Taiwan
Tourist attractions in Miaoli County
Transportation in Miaoli County